Dean and Shelton is a civil parish in the Bedford district, in the ceremonial county of Bedfordshire, England.

The two parishes of Dean and Shelton were combined on 1 April 1934. Until 1974 the parish formed part of Bedford Rural District. In 2011 it had a population of 418.

References

Civil parishes in Bedfordshire
Borough of Bedford